Desmazeria is a genus of Mediterranean plants in the grass family, related to Catapodium.

The genus is named for John Baptiste Henri Joseph Desmazières, (1796-1862) a French merchant, amateur botanist, and editor of scientific journals.

 Species
 Desmazeria lorentii H.Scholz - Tunisia, Libya
 Desmazeria philistaea (Boiss.) H.Scholz  - Tunisia, Libya, Egypt, Palestine, Israel, Jordan, Lebanon, Syria
 Desmazeria pignattii Brullo & Pavone - Sicily
 Desmazeria sicula (Jacq.) Dumort. - Sicily, Sardinia, Calabria, Spain, Algeria, Libya, Tunisia

 formerly included
see Castellia Catapodium Cutandia Halopyrum Sclerochloa Tribolium Wangenheimia

References

Pooideae
Poaceae genera